Zeehan Commonwealth Marine Reserve is a 19,897 km2 marine protected area within Australian waters located west of Tasmania and extending to near King Island. The reserve was established in 2007 and is part of the South-east Commonwealth Marine Reserve Network.

The reserve includes a variety of seabed habitats, including exposed limestone, that provides important habitat for a variety of commercial fish species as well as giant crab.

Protection
The entire Murray marine reserve area is IUCN protected area category VI and has two zones; 'Special Purpose' and 'Multiple Use'.

See also

 Commonwealth marine reserves
 Protected areas of Australia
 Zeehan, Tasmania

Notes

References

External links
 Zeehan Commonwealth Marine Reserve Network website

South-east Commonwealth Marine Reserves Network
Protected areas established in 2007